CJAX-FM is a Canadian radio station in the Greater Vancouver region of British Columbia. Owned by Rogers Sports & Media, it broadcasts an adult hits format branded as Jack 96.9. It broadcasts at 96.9 MHz on the FM band with an effective radiated power of 75,000 watts from a transmitter on Mount Seymour in the District of North Vancouver. The station also operates a 1,430 watt repeater (CJAX-FM-1, 96.9) in Whistler. Its studios are located at 2440 Ash Street in the Fairview neighbourhood of Vancouver.

CJAX was the first conventional radio station in North America to adopt the "Jack" branding, officially classified as a "variety hits" or "adult hits" format. Most "Jack" stations play a wide mix of music from the late 60s through the 90s, as well as some current adult contemporary/hot adult contemporary singles.

History
In 1980, Selkirk Communications launched CJAZ-FM at 92.1 FM in Vancouver, with an all-jazz format, transmitting from Salt Spring Island at 100,000 watts. Although overall regional coverage was very good, poor stereo reception in the key Vancouver area led the station to change frequencies and transmitter site to 96.9 MHz and Mt Seymour in 1984, transmitting at 75,000 watts. Low ratings led to a format change on September 15, 1985, when the station adopted an urban adult contemporary format (the first in Canada), rebranded as FM 97 and the call sign was changed to CKKS-FM. This was followed about a year later by a switch to adult contemporary and another on-air rebranding as 97 Kiss FM. Four years later, the station was sold to Maclean-Hunter Ltd, and in 1994 it became a part of Rogers Broadcasting. The AC format would also arrive on CHQM-FM, which dropped its easy listening format in 1992, and surpassed CKKS as Vancouver's leading AC station, becoming Vancouver's most-listened-to FM station later on.

In 1988, West Coast Community T.V. Association received CRTC approval to add a very low-power transmitter at 102.7 MHz in Ucluelet to rebroadcast the programming of CKKS-FM. The call sign for the Ucluelet transmitter (currently dark) is CIWC-FM.

In December of 2002, the station's adult contemporary format was dropped in favour of Christmas music. On Boxing Day, at 8 a.m., CKKS flipped to adult hits as Jack FM. The first song on "Jack" was "You Shook Me All Night Long" by AC/DC. The flip resulted at the end of the 10-year AC war in Vancouver, which meant that CHQM-FM became the only AC station in the Vancouver market. Given the "attitude" inherent in the "Jack" brand, it was felt that the call sign "CKKS" would maintain an undesirable association with Kiss-FM's "soft favourites" identity. As it turned out, in 2001, Corus Entertainment had abandoned the old CKLG call sign formerly assigned to one of its Vancouver AM stations (Mojo AM 730). Rogers applied to transfer these letters to Jack FM, and the station's call sign became CKLG-FM shortly thereafter. This was in part an attempt to trade on CKLG-AM's history as a popular Vancouver music station in the 1960s, 1970s, and 1980s. The move was successful, as Jack-FM's ratings increased dramatically, at one point briefly surpassing traditional market leader CKNW before settling into the upper rankings in the Vancouver market. The CKKS callsign was subsequently given to a Sechelt rebroadcaster of CISQ-FM in Squamish, British Columbia.

Coincidentally, the "Jack" format was cloned on a Calgary radio station April 1, 2003, on the same frequency as CKLG, and also owned by Rogers Communications. That station was formerly urban CHRK (Kiss FM), as the station changed calls to CKIS-FM and later to CJAQ-FM (after swapping callsigns with Toronto's "Jack" as that station flipped back to top 40 as KiSS). As a result, Jack FM Toronto was the third "Jack" outlet in Canada.

In July 2012, the station adopted the "Playing whatever! Whenever!" slogan. The station also added in more recent adult contemporary/hot adult contemporary songs.

On May 22, 2013, the CRTC approved Rogers' application to relocate its Whistler transmitter, CKLG-FM-1, from its current location to the CBC-owned tower in Whistler. This relocation will result in a decrease in the average effective radiated power (ERP) from 586 to 474 watts (directional antenna with a decrease in the maximum ERP from 1,430 to 1,000 watts) as well as an increase in the effective height of antenna above average terrain from -306.2 to -238.3 metres.

In August 2014, the stations changed its call sign from to CJAX-FM. The "CKLG-FM" call sign was transferred to Rogers-owned CIEG-FM Egmont (rebroadcaster of CISQ-FM Squamish).

In May 2016, CJAX signed on HD Radio operations. On June 23, 2016, CJAX added a simulcast of sister CKWX on its HD2 sub-channel. On August 28, 2017, CJAX added a simulcast of CISL to its HD3 sub-channel.

Controversy
In 2005, some members of Vancouver's Indo-Canadian community accused the station of racial insensitivity with regards to its advertising strategy. The ads in question featured Vijay Chandra, a Fijian radio engineer for the station with a strong Indian accent, singing to promote Jack-FM's "Larry and Willy show". The complaints stem from a perception that viewers are intended to laugh at Chandra's accent, rather than at the ad copy itself, and that similar lyrics performed without an accent would not be considered humorous.

References

External links

Klg
Klg
Jack FM stations
Klg
Radio stations established in 1980
1980 establishments in British Columbia